Razzi may refer to:

 Golden Raspberry Awards, a parody award show
 Giovanni Antonio Bazzi (Il Sodoma; 1477–1549), Italian Renaissance painter whose surname is sometimes corrupted to "Razzi"

See also
 Razzia (disambiguation)
 RAZZIE